is a city located in Nagasaki Prefecture, Japan. Matsuura City is bordered on three sides by mountains. Matsuura Bay, which leads to the Genkai Sea, makes up the fourth side. As of April 1, 2017, the city has an estimated population of 23,566 and a population density of 180 persons per km². The total area is 130.37 km².

History
Mention of a "Matsuura County" appears in written records from the Heian period, and this area was the home of the Matsuura clan, a local warrior clan. Takashima, within the borders of the modern town, is the location where the Mongol invasions of Japan, floundered due to the winds of typhoons in 1274 and 1281, giving rise to the legend of the kamikaze.
In the Edo period, the area was largely under the control of the Hirado Domain. The discovery of coal seams in the early Meiji period led to the rapid economic development of the area in the late 19th and early 20th centuries; however, the coal mines closed in the 1960s.

The modern city was founded on March 31, 1955 through the merger of several towns and villages.

On January 1, 2006, Matsuura absorbed the towns of Fukushima and Takashima (both from Kitamatsuura District) to become the current and expanded city of Matsuura.

Geography

Climate
Matsuura has a humid subtropical climate (Köppen:Cfa) with hot summers and cool winters.

Demographics
Per Japanese census data, the population of Matsuura in 2020 is 21,271 people. Matsuura has been conducting censuses since 1920. Matsuura's population peaked in 1960, when the population exceeded 60,000, and has since declined slowly; in 2020, the city's population is only 50% of what it was in the 1950s.

Overview
Matsuura City is a grouping of small towns, outlying communities, and some islands. Former Shisa Town is the most populated area and makes up downtown and central Matsuura City. East from Shisa is Tsukinokawa, and further east is Imafuku Township, which were separate towns until a few years ago. 

Aoshima is a fairly small island in the bay. Fukushima and Takashima are the largest. Fukushima and Takashima can be accessed by bridge. Fukushima and Tsukinokawa are known for their cascading rice terraces.

Economy
Matsuura is located in a primarily rural area, with several industrial companies located near the city center including a steel works, a commercial fish market, and a regional power plant. The amount of catch at Matsuura fish market is about 89,294 tons. (8th place in Japan)

Sister cities
 Mackay, Australia

References

External links

 Matsuura City official website 

Cities in Nagasaki Prefecture